Pagsanjan (pronounced PAG-sang-han), officially the Municipality of Pagsanjan, is a 3rd class municipality in the province of Laguna, Philippines. According to the 2020 census, it has a population of 44,327 people.

Pagsanjan is the tourist capital of Laguna and is the home of the Bangkero Festival held every March. The bangkeros are tour guides who steer boats along the river to Pagsanjan Falls (also called Magdapio Falls), for which the town is well known but is actually in neighboring Cavinti.

Pagsanjan was the capital of the province of Laguna for 170 years (1688–1858) during which the town prospered as the commercial, cultural and learning center of the province.

Etymology 
Pagsanjan is located in the riparian delta formed by the confluence of the Balanac and Bumbungan rivers. Originally called Pinágsangahán ("branching" or "juncture"), this was shortened to "Pagsanjan" by early Spanish colonists because they found the name very difficult to pronounce.

History 

Pagsanjan was originally a barrio of Lumban. In 1668, eight Japanese and Chinese traders, who were highly impressed by the strategic location of the barrio at the juncture of Balanac and Bumbungan, rivers founded the town. They established a trading settlement and engaged in the betel nut industry. In time, the barrio became the flourishing trading center of eastern Laguna and attracted families from the surrounding communities of Cavinti and Pila. On December 12, 1668, then-Governor-General Juan Manuel de la Peña Bonifaz issued a decree elevating its status to a town. In 1688, Pagsanjan replaced Bay as the capital of the province. It remained such until 1858, during which it bloomed as the cultural and commercial center of the province.

Geography 

Pagsanjan has a land area of 26.4 square kilometres. It is bounded on the east by the Balubad Mountain; on the west by the capital town of Santa Cruz; on the north by the San Isidro Hill and Laguna de Bay; on the north-east by the town of Lumban; on the southeast by the towns of Cavinti and Luisiana; on the south by Mount Banahaw; and on the south-west by the town of Magdalena.

Barangays
Pagsanjan is politically subdivided into 16 barangays.

Climate

Demographics

Economy

Culture

Pagsanjan March
The official song of the town is the Pagsanjan March. The anthem was composed by Rogel Taiño, a native of Pagsanjan.

Notable personalities

 Gregorio F. Zaide - historian and author, "Dean of Filipino Historiographers"
 Pedro Pelaez - educator and priest, considered the "Father of Filipinization of the Church" and "The Godfather of the Philippine Revolution"
 Leandro H. Fernández - educator, author and historian
 Francisco Benitez - First Dean of University of the Philippines College of Education, educator and author, husband of Paz Marquez Benitez
 Conrado Benitez - First Dean of the College of Liberal Arts at the University of the Philippines, educator and author, one of the drafters of the 1935 Constitution.
 José Fabella -  Filipino physician and a public health advocate, Father of Public Health and Social Welfare in the Philippines.
Gelia Tagumpay Castillo – National Scientist of the Philippines for Rural Sociology
 Ernesto Maceda - former councilor of Manila, former senator, columnist and lawyer
 Mario Montenegro - actor
 Louie Ignacio - TV director
 E.R. Ejército - Actor, 17th Governor of Laguna and former Mayor of Pagsanjan

See also
Pagsanjan Falls
Pagsanjan Arch
Our Lady of Guadalupe Parish Church (Pagsanjan)
Pagsanjan Municipal Hall
Bumbungan River
Battle of Pagsanjan

References

External links

www.pagsanjan.com.ph
[ Philippine Standard Geographic Code]
Philippine Census Information
Local Governance Performance Management System

Municipalities of Laguna (province)
Former provincial capitals of the Philippines